Robert Proznik is a Canadian businessman.

In the late nineties, Proznik attempted to purchase the Edmonton Oilers from Peter Pocklington in a $70.0 million USD bid to keep the team in the city. Despite failing to purchase the team, the Oilers remained in the city owned by the Edmonton Investors Group.

In 2008, Proznik was the subject of controversy when he attempted to restrict access to two Edmonton area attractions: Rabbit Hill Snow Resort and Shalom Water Ski Park. The road used by the public to access the areas was located on a piece of land he had recently purchased. After many failed attempt at negotiating a deal with the resorts, Proznik tried to use legal courses to have the road closed to public use. However, the courts ruled against him and restricted him from blocking the roads.

References

Businesspeople from Edmonton
Living people
Year of birth missing (living people)